Las Gabias (commonly referred to as Gabia) is a Spanish city and municipality located in the central southern part of the Vega of Granada, in the province of Granada, in the autonomous community of Andalusia, approximately 8 km from the provincial capital of Granada. It borders the municipalities of Vegas del Genil, Cúllar Vega, Churriana de la Vega, Alhendín, La Malahá, Chimeneas and Santa Fe. Las Gabias includes the localities of "Gabia Grande", the municipal capital, and "Gabia Chica" that were a unified with the region in 1973, in addition to the annexation of Híjar, Los Llanos, Pedro Verde and San Javier. The name may have originated from Hisn Caviar, which means "military tower", in allusion to the one that still exists in Gabia Grande.  It is one of the most populous municipalities in Spain as well as one of the youngest, with the median age of inhabitants being only 34.3 years of age. In 2016, the population of Las Gabias surpassed 20,000, making it the fourth most populous municipality in the Granada Metropolitan Area, surpassed only by Granada, Armilla and Maracena.

History 
To find the first signs of human presence in Las Gabias, we have to go back several thousand years, as confirmed by the ancient "Villa romana de Las Gabias". With Roman domination, the population moves to a nearby area, where there is an important Roman settlement, from which have been discovered the ruins of an oil mill or mill and some dwellings, but the only visible of the area is the Roman Baptistery . Recently Roman remains have been discovered in the annex of Híjar.
In time of Muslim domination Gaviar was denominated Alcobra to the municipality. According to the historian Almagro Cárdenas, the word Gabia comes from Gaviar, which means abundant site in holes, because apparently there existed in this place an Iberian colony destined to exploit the plaster quarries existing in the near "Montevive".

The Muslim occupation, which is shaped in the Tower, an Arab fort raised in the center of the population. Historically, El Torreón played an important role in the defense of the city of Granada: In 1490, was taken by the Christians. That same year, the king Fernando had to demolish it, which did not get to be realized.
The modern history of Las Gabias begins with the Christian reconquest and the repopulation carried out by Felipe II, arriving people from different points of the peninsula.

In the seventeenth century, historians, when mentioning both places, refer to Gavia the Great and Gavia the Girl, replacing in the nineteenth century the "v" by the "b", passing to the definitive name of Gabia Grande, with its annex of Híjar and Gabia Chica, as two independent municipalities, without in any case appearing the name of Las Gabias. Until the 19th century the town belonged to the County of Gavia and in the 19th century was one of the most prosperous and important villages of the province, with the industry of booming textiles and the growing of flax, hemp and beet, until tobacco cultivation was imposed at the beginning of the 20th century. The definitive formation of the municipality of Las Gabias takes place in the year 1.973, with the merger between the old municipalities of Gabia Grande and Gabia Chica.

History 
The history of the town dates back centuries. In 1922, a subterranean building identified as being either paleo-Christian baptistery or Christian-Byzantine, which could be dated to the second half of the fourth century or the first years of the fifth century. There are also remains of a Roman mill and an Islamic tower, which was a strong point of the defense of the city of Granada before the Christian advance from Alhama de Granada. In the town center of Gabia Grande there is a parish dating back to the beginning of the 20th century. This parish is neo-gothic, The old parish due to an earthquake and over the years, had to be demolished. Also in the center of the same town there is a hermitage, dating from the sixteenth century, where the patron saint of the town, "la Virgen de las Nieves". In the middle of the 19th century the bell tower was made. Gabia Chica has a sixteenth-century Byzantine style church that gives worship to the patron saint of the same town, "la Virgen del Rosario".

Economy 
Its economy has been based in the last decades in the agriculture and the production of bricks but at the moment with the crisis of the construction this last sector has lost weight and the majority of the factories of bricks are being closed. Nowadays it has become a large dormitory city and services within the metropolitan area of Granada. It has the first complete golf course of the province and the field of Tiro Juan Carlos I. Formerly a municipality in which dominated the agriculture, thanks to its vega, although already very few people work in this sector. Distribution of uses of agricultural land in 2012.

Geography 
The municipality is very close to the famous hill Montevive, closely linked to Las Gabias although it is not typical of the municipality. In its municipal term runs the Dílar River, besides streams and ravines like the one of "Salao", Las Andas or Los Barrancones. Las Gabias boasts of being very close to the Sierra Nevada, which makes remarkable its landscape variety. In the municipality, there are several towns: Gabia Grande, Gabia Chica and Híjar, as well as other small towns like Los Llanos, Pedro Verde and San Javier. The dryland of the municipality has almonds, olive trees and wheat, and in its rich vega, its maize crop is greater, although previously were other crops such as beets or tobacco.

Weather 
Las Gabias has a continental Mediterranean climate with cold winters and very hot summers. It has extreme temperatures, from a very cold winter (up to ) to very hot summers (up to ). The thermal oscillation from day to night is very high too, especially in Autumn and Spring.

Demographics 
The municipality has had constant population growth for several decades, although the growth of the latter decade has been remarkable. It passed from having 8,577 inhabitants in 2000 to 16,369 inhabitants in 2010. In 2016, the population of the municipality exceeded 20,000, making it the fourth most populous municipality in the Granada Metropolitan Area, surpassed only by Granada, Armilla and Maracena. Las Gabias is considered a commuter town next to other nearby towns. Due to the infamous "real estate boom" suffered in Spain in this century, in 2011 the municipality had 2632 vacant houses. From the analysis of the population pyramid shows that more than 25% of the inhabitants of the municipality were under 20 years and only 8% greater than 65. Also, the small difference of 0.50 in the sex ratio in favor of males was produced in the intervals of age between 0 and 50 years, nevertheless, the population of the women was superior to the one of men from the 52 years. Graph of demographic evolution of Las Gabias between 1877 and 2016

Data of the National Institute of Statistics

Transport and communications 

The road A-338 A-338 connects Las Gabias with Churriana de la Vega, Armilla, Granada and Alhama de Granada.
The following table shows the distances between Las Gabias and other localities, including all the provincial capitals of Andalusia.

Location 
Distance (km)
Location
Distance (km)
Huelva
347
Granada
8
Cádiz
336
Baza
115
Málaga
128
Guadix
71
Córdoba
167
Huéscar
163
Jaén
99
Loja
57
Sevilla
258
Motril
66
Almería
174
Madrid
439
 
It is expected that in 2018 the works of the new Circunvalación de Granada will finish, that passes through the municipality and will improve the accesses to the same one. In the summer of 2014 the works of the Las Gabias-Alhendín beltway finished. What has allowed that the gabirros and other inhabitants of near localities do not have to pass through the urban center of Alhendín to go to the A-44 direction Motril

Bus 
At the moment there are 4 lines by where the buses of the transport consortium of Granada pass. These are the lines that connect the center of Granada with the municipality

Lines 
Route
Line 153
Granada - Cúllar Vega - Vegas del Genil - Híjar
Line 156
Granada - Armilla - Churriana de la Vega - Gabia Grande
Line 157A
Granada - Armilla - Gabia Chica
Line 157B
Granada - Armilla - Gabia Chica - Gabia Grande

Other transport 
The nearest airport for public use is the provincial airport Federico García Lorca. In the territory of the municipality is located the Armilla Air Base (Wing 78).
The subway of Granada connects the municipalities of Albolote, Maracena and Armilla with Granada, in the future could also reach the light metro to Las Gabias.
The taxi association of the Belt of Granada provides service 24 hours a day.
Politics
The results in Las Gabias of the last municipal elections, held in May 2011, are:

Politics 
Municipal elections - Las Gabias (2011)
Political party
Votes
%Valids
Councilor
Popular party (PP)
3.371
44,24%
8
Spanish Socialist Worker's Party(PSOE)
3.305
43,37%
8
United left (IU)
800
10,50%
1
 
These results supposed an adjusted victory of the Popular Party, although a pact of government between PSOE and IU maintained to Vanessa Polo in the mayoralty.
In 2015, the results of the municipal elections were:
 
Municipal elections - Las Gabias (2015)
Political party
Votes
%Valids
Councilor

Spanish Socialist Worker's Party (PSOE)
2.775
34,25%
7

Popular party (PP)
2.325
28,7%
5

Citizen's Party (C´s)
1238
15,28%
3

Now yes- Las Gabias (AHR)
777
9,59%
1

Let's win the Gabias for the people (PG
464
5,73%
1

Prominent figures 
 Pedro M. Cátedra, medievalist.
 Estrella Morente (1980), singer daughter of the well-known Enrique Morente.

References

External links 

  Excmo. Ville de Las Gabias
  

Gabias, Las